Sebastian Koto Khoarai, O.M.I. (11 September 1929 – 17 April 2021) was a prelate of the Catholic Church who was bishop of Mohale's Hoek, Lesotho from 1977 to 2014. He was made a cardinal in 2016 and was the first and so far the only cardinal from Lesotho.

Biography
Khoarai was born in Koaling in the diocese of Leribe in 1929. He entered the Oblates of Mary Immaculate and was ordained a priest in 1956.

In 1977 he was appointed bishop of Mohale's Hoek. He received his episcopal consecration in 1978. In May 2006, he submitted his resignation upon reaching the age limit of 75, but remained as apostolic administrator of the diocese until February 2014. From 1982 to 1987 he served as president of the Episcopal Conference of Lesotho.

On 9 October 2016, Pope Francis announced that Khoarai would be created a cardinal on 19 November 2016 and become Lesotho's first cardinal. Due to his health he was unable to attend the consistory on 19 November, but he later received the biretta in Lesotho from the apostolic nuncio Peter Bryan Wells. 

Khoarai died on 17 April 2021.

References

External links
 
 

1929 births
2021 deaths
20th-century Roman Catholic bishops in Africa
Cardinals created by Pope Francis
Lesotho cardinals
21st-century Roman Catholic bishops in Africa
People from Leribe District
Roman Catholic bishops of Mohale's Hoek
Missionary Oblates of Mary Immaculate